Benalla was an electoral district of the Legislative Assembly in the Australian state of Victoria. The electorate covered a rural area of 17,120 km², and included the towns of Benalla, Bright, Eildon, Euroa, Mansfield, Mount Beauty, Murchison, Myrtleford, Nagambie and Violet Town. The electorate had a population of 47,675 as of the 2006 census, with 36,987 enrolled electors in the 2010 state election.

The seat was created in 1904. Historically a staunchly conservative rural district, it was held by conservative members for most of its history. It was held by various early conservative parties throughout the early 20th century, but became safe for the rural conservative National Party, which held the seat for all but nine years from 1920 to 2000.

This trend was briefly and unexpectedly broken in a 2000 by-election caused by the resignation of long-time National Party leader and former Deputy Premier Pat McNamara. In a major upset, Denise Allen became the first Labor member ever to win it. The seat's conservative nature, however, reasserted itself when Bill Sykes regained the seat for the Nationals at the 2002 election despite a landslide Labor victory which devastated the conservative parties across the state.

The seat reverted to form in the 2006 election, and Sykes held it without serious difficulty until his retirement after the 2014 election. Benalla was abolished at the same time, and was largely replaced with Euroa.

Members for Benalla

Election results

External links
 Benalla District profile, Victorian Electoral Commission

Former electoral districts of Victoria (Australia)
1904 establishments in Australia
2014 disestablishments in Australia